Katherine Hughes or Catherine Hughes may refer to:
Katherine Hughes (activist)  (1876–1925), Canadian writer, archivist and political activist
Catherine Hughes (diplomat) (1933–2014), British diplomat and principal of Somerville College, Oxford
Cathy Hughes (born 1947), American TV personality
Kathryn Hughes (born 1959), British historian, journalist and biographer
Katherine Hughes (actress) (born 1995), American actress
Kate Hughes, fictional character on Emmerdale
Catherine Hughes Building, a building of Somerville College, Oxford

See also
Hughes (surname)

Hughes, Katherine